John Murphy (1786 – September 21, 1841) was the fourth Governor of the U.S. state of Alabama, serving two terms from 1825 to 1829.

Biography

Early life
John Murphy was born in 1786 in Robeson County, North Carolina. He attended South Carolina College, now the University of South Carolina, where he was a member of the Clariosophic Society. Among his classmates at South Carolina College were John Gayle and James Dellet. Gayle also became Governor of Alabama while Dellet became a U.S. Congressman from Alabama. Murphy graduated in 1808.

Career
He became a clerk at the South Carolina Senate. He was a trustee for the University of South Carolina from 1808 to 1818.

In 1818, he moved to Alabama and was elected to the Alabama House in 1820 and the Alabama Senate in 1822. He was elected Governor of Alabama in 1824, and in 1827 he was elected for a second term. He represented Alabama in the United States House of Representatives from 1833 to 1835.

Personal life
Under the date of April 2, 1834, John Quincy Adams records in his diary that Congressman James Blair "shot himself last evening at his lodgings ... after reading part of an affectionate letter from his wife, to Governor Murphy, of Alabama, who was alone in the chamber with him, and a fellow-lodger at the same house." Diary (New York: Longmans, Green, 1929) p. 434.

Death
He died in 1841 in Clarke County, Alabama.

References

External links

1786 births
1841 deaths
University of South Carolina alumni
Democratic Party governors of Alabama
People from Robeson County, North Carolina
Jacksonian members of the United States House of Representatives from Alabama
19th-century American politicians
Democratic Party members of the Alabama House of Representatives
Democratic Party Alabama state senators